Leucanimorpha is a monotypic moth genus of the family Erebidae. Its only species, Leucanimorpha disjuncta, is found in Somalia. Both the genus and the species were first described by Francis Walker in 1870.

References

Hypeninae
Monotypic moth genera